Crombie 1805 Ltd., formerly known as J&J Crombie Ltd., is a Scottish fashion company, producing high-end clothing and accessories under the Crombie brand name. Crombie is most famous for its luxury coats; so much so that the word 'Crombie' is sometimes used by other companies to refer to their own coats produced in the style of Crombie's most famous three-quarter length (usually wool) overcoats, although the Crombie company has been known to take legal action to prevent this trademark word from being used generically.

History
Crombie was founded by John Crombie and his son James in Aberdeen, Scotland, in 1805, making it one of Scotland’s oldest brands. Crombie has manufactured from several different mills in Scotland and England for over two centuries, initially at Cothal Mills in Aberdeen, and most famously from 1859 at Grandholm Mill also in Aberdeen. Crombie began as a producer of luxury cloth, which it sold to cloth merchants and direct to London tailors. By the 1850s, Crombie had won quality awards from Queen Victoria and Napoleon III at the Great Exhibition in London and the Exposition Universelle in Paris respectively. Later, Crombie expanded from simply manufacturing the fabric for other producers, to creating coats under its own name. A key factor in Crombie's expansion, from the 1860s onwards, was the receipt of military contracts. Crombie supplied officers' uniforms to the British Army and Royal Air Force in the First and Second World Wars. After the Second World War, Crombie became part of Illingworth Morris; at that time Britain's largest woollen textile company, of which actress Pamela Mason was the majority shareholder.

In 1883 the company registered its incorporated status as a company limited by shares under the Companies Acts 1862 to 1880, in Scotland on 20 November. The founding Crombie family sold their interest in the company in 1928, to another British textile family, the Salts (famous as the founders of Saltaire in West Yorkshire). Crombie had a wide-ranging export market into Japan and the United States. with Japanese sales said to have climaxed to £50,000 per year in the 1920s – which equates to approximately £2.35M in today’s market. By the 1930s Crombie coats had commenced advertisements for both male and female genders in Canadian, Australian and US newspapers. The Crombie trademark was registered on 7 September 1949. Initially the design type was said to hold shields containing figurative elements or inscriptions. The trademark was later adapted with the addition of various leaves and thistles in 2011.

Beginning in the early 1960s, Crombie coats were fashionable among mods, who saw them as a stylish item of clothing that enhanced their clean-cut image. It was an alternative to the popular fishtail parka or trenchcoat. As the 1960s wore on, and into the early 1970s, Crombie-style coats were popular within the skinhead and suedehead subcultures.

In the 1980s the company was purchased and became privately owned.

Crombie has long appealed to international statesmen and royalty. Crombie lists King George VI, Winston Churchill, Cary Grant, Dwight D Eisenhower and John F Kennedy among its historic customers. Alongside this list of patrons, actor Jack Nicholson wore several styles of Crombie coat in his role as The Joker in the 1989 film, Batman. 

In 1990, production at the Grandholm Mill ceased, and was moved to other mills in Scotland and England. (The A-listed Grandholm factory site was converted into a residential project in 2005. ) 

From 1995 to 2004, Crombie also held the royal warrant as a supplier to the Prince of Wales. In 2014 it was announced the new Twelfth Doctor, as played by Peter Capaldi, would wear a Crombie with a red lining. Such was the success of Capaldi's role as Doctor Who, Crombie saw an increase in sales by 100%. The Crombie style incorporated a heavy, dark, woollen, knee-length overcoat paired with a red, silk, handkerchief in the upper pocket. In 1996 designer William Johnston Ewart, inspired by the deep tones of the iconic Crombie Overcoating Range, created tartan which was placed on the Scottish Register of Tartans for the Crombie House Check.

Crombie previously had retail stores in London, Manchester and Edinburgh, was sold through independent retailers, such as Harrods and department stores in North America, Europe and East Asia. Crombie also sold worldwide via its website.

At the beginning of the Covid-19 Pandemic, on 29 April 2020, Crombie gave notice via its social media channels that their online store would be closing. Subsequently, on 16 May 2020, Crombie shared a press release stating they had suspended operations until further notice. A message was placed on their website as a holding page to mirror this announcement. 

In March 2022 it was announced that Crombie is under new ownership. Crombie 1805 acquired the business and the trademarks of J. & J. Crombie Ltd.

References

External links
Official Crombie website

Clothing companies of Scotland
Scottish brands
Clothing brands of the United Kingdom
Clothing manufacturers
British companies established in 1805
1805 establishments in Scotland